Stade du Moulias, officially known as Stade Jacques-Fouroux and also known as Stade Patrice-Brocas (actually the name of the sports complex where the stadium sits), is a multi-use stadium in Auch, France.  It is currently used mostly for rugby union matches and is the home stadium of FC Auch Gers.  The stadium is able to hold 7,000 people.

External links
Stadium information

Moulias
Sports venues in Gers